Chotěšice is a municipality and village in Nymburk District in the Central Bohemian Region of the Czech Republic. It has about 300 inhabitants.

Administrative parts
Villages of Břístev, Malá Strana, Nouzov and Nová Ves are administrative parts of Chotěšice.

Geography
It lies in the Central Elbe Table lowland. The Smíchovský Stream flows through the municipality.

History
The first written mention of Chotěšice is in a deed of King Ottokar I of Bohemia from 1199.

Sights
The landmark of Chotěšice is the Church of the Sending of the Holy Apostles. It was first mentioned in the 14th century and rebuilt in the Renaissance style in 1599.

Gallery

References

External links

Villages in Nymburk District